The Brewing Industry Research Foundation is now part of Campden BRI, a research association serving all sectors of the food and drink industry. The Brewing Division is based next to the M23, and the other Divisions are located in Chipping Campden, Gloucestershire, where about 330 people are employed.

History

Formation
In 1946 the Institute of Brewing recommended the setting up of an experimental research station, the Brewing Industry Research Foundation, with a full-time Director of Research and in 1947 Dr J Masson Gulland (Professor of Organic Chemistry, the University of Nottingham) was appointed to that position. Sadly Dr Masson Gulland was killed in a train crash before taking up his position and hence Sir Ian Heilbron (Imperial College London) agreed to become the second Director of Research at the new Brewing Industry Research Foundation (BIRF)in 1949.

Research building
In 1948 Lyttel Hall, Nutfield in Surrey was purchased and the main Hall was converted into laboratories, the squash court into a pilot brewery and other new buildings were developed as a workshops and conference facilities. In 1951 the Duke of Edinburgh Prince Philip formally opened the site. BIRF later became The Brewing Research Foundation, BRF International, Brewing Research International and today is simply known as BRI.

Research scope
Initially the BIRF focused on fundamental and applied research for the malting and brewing industries of the UK. Its staff made useful contributions in the areas of barley germination and yeast physiology. Since that time its role has evolved to become more service orientated offering analysis, food safety and information packages to an international client base.

Brewers Patents Ltd
The control of Brewing Patents Ltd was transferred in 1976 from the Brewers' Society to the Brewing Research Foundation.

Important Brewing Scientist Training Ground
Many young scientists of the Brewing Industry found initial employment at this Foundation to become important contributors elsewhere in the Brewing and allied industries.

Merger
In October 2008, Campden BRI was formed by the merger of Brewing Research International with Campden & Chorleywood Food Research Association (CCFRA) of Chipping Campden, which was formed in 1919 and is the largest membership-based food research organisation in the world. In the 1920s it devised the Campden Solution, which was later commercialised as the Campden Tablet.

Functions
Its services are used by the vast majority of the world's brewing companies.

References

External links
 Campden BRI
 Brewing Research International
 Brewers Patents Ltd

News items

 Healthy cider in May 2002

Beer in the United Kingdom
Food science institutes
Research institutes in Surrey
Research institutes in Gloucestershire
Organizations established in 1946